Abu Qir Fertilizers Sports Club, is a football club establsihed by the privatised Abu Qir Fertilizers and Chemicals Industries Company (ABUK.CA) in Alexandria, Egypt. Abu Qir currently plays in Egyptian Second Division Group C.

In the 2010–11 season, they finished in 4th place in Group C.

Current squad

Managers
 Salah El-Nahy (July 1, 2007 – May 14, 2010)
 Ahmed El-Kass (May 28, 2010– )

References

Football clubs in Egypt
Sports clubs in Egypt